The EuroBasket Women 2015 final was played at the Syma Sport and Events Centre in Budapest, Hungary, on 28 June 2015, between Serbia and France.

Road to the final

|bgcolor=#F7F6A8|First Round
|colspan=2 align=center|

|}
|- valign=top bgcolor=#F7F6A8
|Opponent
|Result
|bgcolor=#F7F6A8|
|Opponent
|Result
|-
|align=left|
|76–74
|bgcolor=#F7F6A8|Game 1
|align=left|
|51–42
|-
|align=left|
|80–91
|bgcolor=#F7F6A8|Game 2
|align=left|
|56–66
|-
|align=left|
|72–73
|bgcolor=#F7F6A8|Game 3
|align=left|
|64–58
|-
|colspan="2" align=center|

|}
|bgcolor=#F7F6A8|Second Round
|colspan=2 align=center|

|}
|- valign=top bgcolor=#F7F6A8
|Opponent
|Result
|bgcolor=#F7F6A8|
|Opponent
|Result
|-
|align=left|
|75–63
|bgcolor=#F7F6A8|Quarterfinals
|align=left|
|77–74
|-
|align=left|
|74–72
|bgcolor=#F7F6A8|Semifinals
|align=left|
|63–58
|}

Match details

References

final
2014–15 in Serbian basketball
2014–15 in French basketball
Serbia women's national basketball team games
France women's national basketball team games
2015